(born November 23, 1975) is a Japanese model and actress. As an 18-year-old, she made her model debut on Japanese fashion magazine JJ in March 1994. She was one of the top models for the magazine until 2001, when she temporarily quit modelling to concentrate on her acting career.  She is now working for the fashion magazine CLASSY.

Biography
Hatano was born in the Saitama prefecture in 1975. She attended Urawa Gakuin High School, in Urawa, Saitama, and began her modeling career during her high school days by appearing in JJ.

Career 
For several years she was one of the top fashion models in Japan.  Standing 168 cm tall, she was one of the tallest Japanese models at the time.

Hatano made her TV debut in the drama , in 1997, playing a small role. Some of the dramas she appeared became instant hits in Japan, helping her to establish herself in the Japanese TV industry.

Some of the TV dramas she has appeared in:

She is starring in the drama series .

Private life 
Playing piano is one of her favourite pastimes. In 2004 she married Takashi Kashiwabara, also an actor, and temporarily quit her acting career. But the marriage soon ended in a divorce and in 2005 she was back in the entertainment industry. Before the marriage, she was known as  but after her come back she decided to change her name and adopted the name .

On August 21, 2008, Hatano announced her intention to marry footballer Keita Suzuki, by whom she has been pregnant for two months beforehand.

References and further reading

External links
Official site 
Tokyo Love Collection Home page 
Profile 

1975 births
Living people
Actors from Saitama Prefecture
Japanese actresses
Japanese female models
Models from Saitama Prefecture